Jean Paul Whittacker, better known by his ring name Johnny Palazzio, (born 6 March 1980) is a South African professional wrestler currently performing for Africa Wrestling Alliance. He is the current 2-time African Cruiserweight Champion and previously held the title for 4 years until he lost the title to William McQueen on 2 December 2008.

Career
After training at the AWA Wrestling Academy, Johnny Palazzio made his professional wrestling debut for the Africa Wrestling Alliance in 2002 as JP, teaming up with Viper and The Clown to take on Ultimo Wulf, Nitro and William McQueen in a losing effort. He became embroiled in a heated feud with Nitro for the rest of 2002 and 2003, then made his debut at the Parow Civic Centre, the AWA's most widely used venue, teaming up with Viper and losing to Nitro and Ultimo Wulf.

In 2004, he dominated the cruiserweight division for most of the year. Palazzio teamed up with his trainee Tygra to defeat Wolf and Saphire in South African wrestling's first-ever mixed gender tag team match. Later in the year, he feuded with nemesis Archangel. On 11 December 2004, at the AWF on E Slam Series Final broadcast live on eTV, he defeated Archangel in a 12-man cruiserweight battle royal to become the first-ever AWA African Cruiserweight Champion.

In 2005, he feuded with the larger African Warrior in a bid to prove he could defeat anyone. They had a 5-match series, which took place in various parts of South Africa and Swaziland. Both wrestlers won 2 matches, and the final match ended in a time-limit draw.

He defended the AWA African Cruiserweight Championship in South Africa's first-ever ladder match on 16 June 2007 at the Parow Civic Centre, defeating William McQueen and Vinnie Vegas.

On 2 December 2008 at AWA Coca-Cola Royal Rumble: Last Man Standing in a Four-Way Elimination match also involving William McQueen, Vinnie Vegas and Warlock, his four-year reign as the AWA African Cruiserweight Champion ended when he was pinned by William McQueen.

On 7 April 2009 he became a 2-time champion when he won the title back from McQueen.

In 2004 he made a guest appearance on the South African sitcom Madam & Eve.

Championships and accomplishments
Africa Wrestling Alliance
AWA African Heavyweight Championship (1 time)
AWA African Cruiserweight Championship (2 times)
Pro Wrestling Illustrated
 PWI ranked him #453 of the 500 best singles wrestlers in 2007.

References

External links
Profile on Roster Page at the AWA Web Site (Scroll down)

1980 births
Living people
South African male professional wrestlers